This is a list of video games adapted from films.

List of games based on films

See also 
 List of films based on video games

Notes

References

Video games based on films